Lisa Christine Schuster (born 28 May 1987) is a German ice hockey player for OSC Berlin and the German national team. She participated at the 2015 IIHF Women's World Championship.

International career
Schuster was selected for the Germany women's national ice hockey team in the 2014 Winter Olympics. She recorded one assist.

Schuster also played for Germany in the qualifying event for the 2014 Winter Olympics, and the 2010 Olympics

As of 2014, Schuster has also appeared for Germany at four IIHF Women's World Championships. Her first appearance came in 2008.

Career statistics
Through 2013-14 season

References

External links
Eurohockey.com Profile
Sports-Reference Profile

1987 births
Living people
Ice hockey players at the 2014 Winter Olympics
Olympic ice hockey players of Germany
Ice hockey people from Berlin
German women's ice hockey forwards